Larissa Szporluk is an American poet and professor. Her most recent book is Embryos & Idiots (Tupelo Press, 2007). Her poems have appeared in literary journals and magazines including Daedalus, Faultline, Meridian, American Poetry Review, and Black Warrior Review. Her honors include two The Best American Poetry awards, a Pushcart Prize, and fellowships from Guggenheim, the National Endowment for the Arts, and the Ohio Arts Council.

Background
She was raised in Ann Arbor, Michigan and graduated from the University of Michigan. She studied at the Iowa Writers’ Workshop and graduated from University of California, Berkeley, and the University of Virginia with an MFA, where she was a Henry Hoyns fellow. She was a visiting professor at Cornell University, in 2005, and currently teaches at Bowling Green State University. Her work has been included in anthologies such as The Best American Poetry 1999 (Scribner, 1999), Best of Beacon 1999 (Beacon Press, 2000), The new young American poets (Southern Illinois University Press, 2000), Best American Poetry 2001 (Simon and Schuster, 2001) and Twentieth-century American poetry (McGraw Hill, 2004).

Honors & awards
 2009 Guggenheim Fellow
 2003-2004 National Endowment for the Arts Fellowship in Poetry
 2003-2004 Ohio Arts Council Individual Award for Poetry
 1997 Barnard Women Poets Prize
 1998 Rona Jaffe Foundation Writers' Award
 Iowa Poetry Prize, for Isolato

Poetry collections

References

External links
 "Featured Poet:Larissa Szporluk", Web del Sol
 "An Interview with Larissa Szporluk", Matt McBride, Memorious 11, December 2008
 
 

Year of birth missing (living people)
Living people
University of Michigan alumni
University of California, Berkeley alumni
University of Virginia alumni
Bowling Green State University faculty
Cornell University faculty
Iowa Writers' Workshop alumni
People from Wood County, Ohio
Poets from Ohio
Poets from Michigan
National Endowment for the Arts Fellows
American women poets
Rona Jaffe Foundation Writers' Award winners
Writers from Ann Arbor, Michigan
American women academics
21st-century American women